Harriet Elizabeth Brown (February 10, 1907  — January 1, 2009) was a Calvert County school teacher who pushed for equal pay, regardless of race, in Maryland education. With the help of NAACP attorney Thurgood Marshall, Brown brought suit against the Calvert County Board of Education in 1937. At the time, African-American teachers were paid significantly less than their Euro-American colleagues. Brown was paid almost 50% less than her Euro-American counterparts with similar credentials. Calvert County settled on December 27, 1937 and agreed to equalize pay. Two years later, the Maryland Teachers Pay Equalization Law was passed, the first Maryland state equalization law.  Brown is honored in the Maryland Women's Hall of Fame.

References

1907 births
2009 deaths